Philharmonia basinigra is a moth in the family Lecithoceridae. It was described by Wang and Wang in 2015. It is found in China (Tibet, Fujian, Guangdong, Jiangxi, Zhejiang).

References

Moths described in 2015
Philharmonia